Ramadasa is a genus of moths of the family Noctuidae described by Frederic Moore in 1877.

Description
Palpi naked and upturned, flattened and reaching vertex of head, where the third joint minute. Antennae simple. Thorax and abdomen smoothly scaled. Tibia spineless and slightly clothed with hairy. Forewings with oblique outer margin from vein 5 to outer angle. Vein 8 and 9 anastomosing to form an areole.

Species
 Ramadasa crystallina Lower, 1899
 Ramadasa fumipennis Warren, 1916
 Ramadasa pavo Walker, 1856
 Ramadasa plumbeola Warren, 1916
 Ramadasa pratti Bethune-Baker, 1908

References

Calpinae
Moth genera